Deborah Gruen is a former American Paralympic swimmer.

Biography
Deborah Gruen started swimming when she was 5-years-old. She began competing for Paralympic Games in 2004 where she won her first bronze medal in 2004 Paralympic Games which were held in Athens, Greece for  breaststroke. Four years later she won another one at 2008 Summer Paralympics which were held in Beijing, China. In 2009, she was awarded silver medal at Paralympic World Cup which was held at Manchester, England. Besides Olympics she also held two world records in 2006 for  breaststroke and  freestyle at U.S. Paralympics Swimming National Championships in San Antonio, Texas and one more in 2009 for  individual medley at Spring Canadian-American Championships in Portland, Oregon.

She enrolled into Yale University in 2006 and also studied Chinese at Peking University. She retired from competitive swimming in 2009, after which she attended law school at Georgetown University Law Center starting in 2010, from which she graduated in 2013. Following her graduation from law school, she clerked for the Hon. Roy W. McLeese III of the District of Columbia Court of Appeals. She is currently a corporate partner at the international law firm Simpson Thacher & Bartlett.

References

Paralympic swimmers of the United States
Paralympic bronze medalists for the United States
Swimmers at the 2004 Summer Paralympics
Swimmers at the 2008 Summer Paralympics
American female breaststroke swimmers
American female freestyle swimmers
American female medley swimmers
Living people
Date of birth missing (living people)
Medalists at the 2004 Summer Paralympics
Medalists at the 2008 Summer Paralympics
Year of birth missing (living people)
Paralympic medalists in swimming
21st-century American women
Yale University alumni
Georgetown University Law Center alumni
People from Hamden, Connecticut
S6-classified Paralympic swimmers
Simpson Thacher & Bartlett